Apóstoles is a city in the province of Misiones, Argentina. It is located on the southwest of the province, 60 km south from the provincial capital Posadas and 27 km from the international Argentina–Brazil border.

Apóstoles is the National Capital of yerba mate, and hosts an annual festival dedicated to this plant, the basis of the popular mate infusion.

The town was established as a Jesuit reduction in 1652. The first wave of immigrants, mainly Polish and Ukrainian, arrived in 1897. The municipality was officially created on 28 November 1913.

See also

Chango Spasiuk

References

 
 Municipality of Apóstoles (official website).
 Feast of the yerba mate (official website).
 Apóstoles Facebook (official website).
 Municipality Facebook (official website).
 Feast of the Yerba Mate Facebook (official website).

Populated places in Misiones Province
Populated places established in 1652
1652 establishments in the Spanish Empire
Cities in Argentina
Argentina
Misiones Province